Vincent D. Young (born June 4, 1965, in Philadelphia, Pennsylvania) is an American actor best known for playing "Noah Hunter" on the TV Series Beverly Hills, 90210.  He was on the show from 1997 to 2000.

Young has also made guest appearances on CSI: New York, NCIS, and JAG. Young joined the cast of "Long Gone Heroes" in 2019.

Filmography

References

External links

1965 births
Living people
American male television actors
20th-century American male actors
21st-century American male actors